A Hope More Powerful than the Sea is a book by Melissa Fleming about Syrian refugee Doaa Al Zamel's experiences leading up to and during the 2014 Malta migrant shipwreck.

Production 
A Hope More Powerful than the Sea was published by Fleet in 2017. It was written by Melissa Fleming, the chief spokesperson for United Nations High Commissioner for Refugees.

Synopsis 
The book starts with Doaa Al Zamel's early life, growing up in Daraa, Syria. Al Zamel has a happy childhood, living in the extended family home, until the Syrian civil war breaks out. Her family flee to Egypt where she gets engaged to Bassam. In Egypt, Bassam and Al Zamel pay people smugglers to move them to Europe, boarding a boat with 500 other refugees. The boat capsizes in the Mediterranean Sea, with all but eleven of the passengers drowning. Bassam does not make it, Al Zamel is one of the eleven.

Critical reception 
Jenny Sawyer writing in The Christian Science Monitor credit's Fleming's ability to tell the personal story and frame it in the wider refugee crisis, but also notes the lack of Al Zamel's own voice, the story only ever being told by the third party narrator.

Hannah Solel writing in the Financial Times called the book gripping and moving.

Screen adaption 
Steven Spielberg bought the rights to the book, but production stopped after the producers received media backlash in 2018 for commissioning white American writer and actor Lena Dunham for penning the script, accused them of whitewashing.

References 

2017 non-fiction books
Works about wars
Books about refugees
Books about Syria
Books about war